Memorial Stadium is a 12,000-capacity county-owned stadium located in Waycross, Georgia, the largest city in and county seat of Ware County in the southern part of the state.

Noted for its J-shaped main stand, Memorial Stadium was originally intended as a multi-use venue that would be home to both baseball and football in Ware County. During the 1950s and 1960s the stadium played host to a duo of Georgia–Florida League teams, the Bears and the Braves in addition to hosting high school football in the autumn.

In 2002 the stadium was renovated and became a venue exclusively for sports played on rectangular fields (chiefly football, though soccer is also played at the venue occasionally) with the addition of a new stand running along the northern sideline.

Defunct baseball venues in the United States
High school football venues in the United States
Soccer venues in Georgia (U.S. state)
Sports venues in Georgia (U.S. state)
Buildings and structures in Ware County, Georgia
American football venues in Georgia (U.S. state)
Waycross, Georgia micropolitan area